Wande may refer to:
 Wande, Shandong, a town in Changqing District, Jinan, Shandong, China
 Wande, Yunnan, a town in Wuding County, Yunnan, China
 Wande (river), a river in Hesse, Germany
 Wande (rapper)

See also 
 Wande Nadoum, a village in Kara Region, Togo